The 1909 European Rowing Championships were rowing championships held on the Seine in Juvisy-sur-Orge just upstream of the French capital of Paris on 22 August. The competition was for men only and they competed in five boat classes (M1x, M2x, M2+, M4+, M8+).

Medal summary

Footnotes

References

European Rowing Championships
European Rowing Championships
Rowing
Rowing
Sports competitions in Paris
European
European Rowing Championships